{{DISPLAYTITLE:C9H7Cl2N5}}
The molecular formula C9H7Cl2N5 (molar mass: 256.091 g/mol, exact mass: 255.0079 u) may refer to:

 Irsogladine, or DCPDAT
 Lamotrigine

Molecular formulas